Simone Arianne Biles (born March 14, 1997) is an American artistic gymnast. Her seven Olympic medals tied with Shannon Miller for the most Olympic medals won by an American gymnast and is the equal ninth-most overall. Having won 25 World Championship medals, she is the most decorated gymnast in the history of the Gymnastics World Championships, and is considered by many sources to be the greatest gymnast of all time. In 2022, Biles was awarded the Presidential Medal of Freedom by Joe Biden.

At the 2016 Summer Olympics in Rio de Janeiro, Biles won individual gold medals in the all-around, vault, and floor; bronze on balance beam; and gold as part of the United States team, dubbed the "Final Five". At the 2020 Summer Olympics in Tokyo, where Biles was favored to win at least four of the six available gold medals, she withdrew from most of the competition due to struggles with "the twisties", a temporary loss of air balance awareness. She ultimately won a silver medal with the US team and a bronze medal on the balance beam. Her partial withdrawal, focus on safety, mental health, and perseverance were praised. She is also a five-time World all-around champion (2013–2015, 2018–2019), five-time World floor exercise champion (2013–2015, 2018–2019), three-time World balance beam champion (2014–2015, 2019), two-time World vault champion (2018–2019), a seven-time United States national all-around champion (2013–2016, 2018–2019, 2021), and a member of the gold medal-winning American teams at the 2014, 2015, 2018, and 2019 World Artistic Gymnastics Championships. She is also a three-time World silver medalist (2013 and 2014 on vault, 2018 on uneven bars) and a three-time World bronze medalist (2015 on vault, 2013 and 2018 on balance beam).

Biles is the gymnast with the most World medals (25) and most World gold medals (19), having surpassed Vitaly Scherbo's record 23 World medals by winning her 24th and 25th, both gold, at the 2019 competition in Stuttgart. She is the female gymnast with the most World all-around titles (5). She is the sixth woman to win an individual all-around title at both the World Championships and the Olympics, and the first gymnast since Lilia Podkopayeva in 1996 to hold both titles simultaneously. She is the tenth female gymnast and first American female gymnast to win a World medal on every event, and the first female gymnast since Daniela Silivaș in 1988 to win a medal on every event at a single Olympic Games or World Championships, having accomplished this feat at the 2018 World Championships in Doha.

Early life and education
Biles was born on March 14, 1997, in Columbus, Ohio, the third of four siblings. Her birth mother, Shanon Biles, was unable to care for Simone or her other childrenAdria, Ashley, and Tevin. All four went in and out of foster care.

In 2000, Biles' maternal grandfather, Ron Biles, and his second wife, Nellie Cayetano Biles, began temporarily caring for Shanon's children in the north Houston suburb of Spring, Texas, after learning that his grandchildren had been in foster care. In 2003, the couple officially adopted Simone and her younger sister Adria. Ron's sister, Shanon's aunt Harriet, adopted the two oldest children. Biles holds Belizean citizenship through her adoptive mother and refers to Belize as her second home. Biles and her family are Catholic.

Biles attended Benfer Elementary School in Harris County. In 2012, Biles made the choice to switch from public school to home school, allowing her to increase her training from approximately 20 to 32 hours per week. She gained all of her secondary education as a homeschooler, graduating in mid-2015. Biles verbally committed to UCLA on August 4, 2014. She planned to defer enrollment until after the 2016 Summer Olympics in Rio de Janeiro; in November 2014, she signed her National Letter of Intent with UCLA. On July 29, 2015, she announced that she would turn professional and forfeit her NCAA eligibility to compete for UCLA.

Gymnastics career

Pre-elite
Biles first tried gymnastics at age 6 during a day-care field trip. The instructors suggested she continue with gymnastics. Biles soon enrolled in an optional training program at Bannon's Gymnastics. She began training with coach Aimee Boorman at age eight.

Junior

2011
Biles began her elite career at age 14 on July 1, 2011, at the 2011 American Classic in Houston. She placed third all-around, first on vault and balance beam, fourth on floor exercise, and eighth on uneven bars. Later that month, Biles competed at the 2011 U.S. Classic in Chicago, Illinois, where she placed 20th all-around, fifth on balance beam and floor exercise.

2012
Biles' first meet of 2012 was the American Classic hosted in Huntsville, Texas. She placed first all-around and on vault, tied for second on floor exercise, placed third on balance beam, and fourth on uneven bars.

Biles' placement in the American Classic secured her a spot to compete at the 2012 USA Gymnastics National Championships. She later competed at the 2012 U.S. Classic in Chicago. She finished first all-around and on vault, second on floor exercise, and sixth on balance beam. In June, she made her second appearance at the U.S. National Championships in St. Louis, Missouri. She finished third all-around, first on vault, and sixth on uneven bars, balance beam, and floor exercise. After this performance, Biles was named to the U.S. Junior National Team by a committee headed by Márta Károlyi, the National Team Coordinator (2001–2016).

Senior

2013
Biles' senior international debut was in March at the 2013 American Cup, a FIG World Cup event. She and Katelyn Ohashi were named as replacements for Elizabeth Price and 2012 Olympic gold medalist Kyla Ross, both of whom withdrew from the competition because of injuries. Biles led for two rotations but finished second behind her teammate, Ohashi, after a fall off the beam.

Biles traveled to Jesolo, Italy to compete at the 2013 City of Jesolo Trophy. She took the all-around, vault, balance beam, and floor exercise titles in addition to contributing to the U.S. team's gold medal. She and the U.S. delegation next competed at an international tri-meet in Chemnitz, Germany, against teams from Germany and Romania. The U.S. won the team gold medal. In addition, Biles won the vault, balance beam, and floor titles, and tied for second in the all-around, behind Kyla Ross, after a fall on the uneven bars.

In July, Biles competed at the 2013 U.S. Classic. She performed poorly, falling several times, and did not compete vault after twisting her ankle on the floor exercise. In the aftermath of this poor performance, Biles consulted a sports psychologist whom she credits with helping her anxiety and confidence issues and allowing her to begin her streak of dominance in the sport.

Biles competed at the 2013 USA Gymnastics National Championships in August, where she was crowned the national all-around champion. Biles also won silver on all four individual events. After the USA Gymnastics National Championships, Biles was named to the Senior National Team and was invited to the qualifying camp for the 2013 World Artistic Gymnastics Championships in Texas. She was selected for the World Championships team.

In October, Biles competed at the 2013 World Artistic Gymnastics Championships in Antwerp, Belgium. She qualified first in the all-around, second to the vault final, sixth to the uneven bars final, fifth to the balance beam final, and first to the floor final, making her the first American gymnast to qualify to the all-around and all four event finals since Shannon Miller in 1991. Biles competed cleanly during the women's individual all-around and won the competition with a score of 60.216, almost a point ahead of silver medalist Ross, and almost a point and a half better than the bronze medalist, 2010 world all-around champion Aliya Mustafina.

At the age of 16, Biles became the seventh American woman and the first African American to win the world all-around title. In event finals, she won silver on the vault, behind defending world champion and Olympic silver medalist McKayla Maroney and ahead of 2008 Olympic gold medalist Hong Un Jong of North Korea; bronze on balance beam, behind Mustafina and Ross; and gold on the floor exercise, ahead of Italy's Vanessa Ferrari and Romania's Larisa Iordache. She finished fourth in the uneven bars final, behind China's Huang Huidan, Ross, and Mustafina.

2014
Biles missed the start of the season due to injury, sitting out the 2014 AT&T American Cup and the 2014 Pacific Rim Championships. Her debut that year was at the U.S. Classic in Chicago. She won the all-around by a wide margin and also took first place on vault, beam (tied with Ross), and floor. At the 2014 USA Gymnastics National Championships, Biles repeated as national all-around champion after two days of competition, finishing more than four points ahead of silver medalist Ross, despite a fall from the balance beam during her final routine of the meet. She won the gold on vault and floor, tied for the silver on balance beam with Alyssa Baumann, and finished fourth on the uneven bars. She was once again selected for the Senior National Team.

On September 17, Biles was selected to compete at the 2014 World Artistic Gymnastics Championships in Nanning, China. She dominated the preliminary round despite a major error on the uneven bars, qualifying in first place to the all-around, vault, beam, and floor finals, in addition to contributing to the U.S. team's first-place qualification into the team final. During the team final, Biles led the United States to its second consecutive world team championship, which they won over the second-place Chinese team by nearly seven points. In the all-around, Biles performed cleanly on all four events, bettering her bars score from qualifications by more than a point, and won her second consecutive world all-around title ahead of Ross and Romanian Larisa Iordache. Biles became the second American woman to repeat as world all-around champion, following Miller (1993 and 1994), and the first woman of any nationality to do so since Russia's Svetlana Khorkina (2001 and 2003). Biles finished behind North Korea's Hong Un Jong in the vault competition, taking her second consecutive silver medal in that event. She won the gold in the balance-beam final ahead of China's Bai Yawen and the gold in the floor exercise final, again, ahead of Iordache. This brought her total of World Championship gold medals to six, the most ever by an American gymnast, surpassing Miller's five.

2015 
Biles competed at the 2015 AT&T American Cup at AT&T Stadium in Arlington, Texas, on March 7. She placed first with a score of 62.299, 4.467 points ahead of second-place finisher U.S. teammate MyKayla Skinner. Later that month, Biles was nominated for the James E. Sullivan Award. She ended the month at the 2015 City of Jesolo Trophy, winning the all-around title with 62.100.

On July 25, she competed at the U.S. Classic and finished first in the all-around, ahead of 2012 Olympic all-around champion Gabby Douglas and Maggie Nichols, with a score of 62.400. On the beam, she scored a 15.250 and took first at the event, ahead of Douglas and 2012 Olympic beam bronze medalist Aly Raisman. She scored a 16.050 on the floor and claimed first on the event, 1.050 points ahead of Douglas and also ahead of Nichols and Bailie Key. She had a small hop on her Amanar vault and scored a 16.000. She then scored 15.150 on her second vault, to score an average of 15.575 and place first in the event, ahead of 2014 Worlds vault bronze medalist and teammate MyKayla Skinner, who averaged 14.950. Biles ended on bars and scored a 15.100 to claim the all-around title. She placed fourth in the event behind 2014 Worlds teammate Madison Kocian, Douglas, and Key.

At the 2015 U.S. National Championships, Biles secured her third all-around national title, becoming only the second woman ever to do so, 23 years after Kim Zmeskal (1990, 1991, 1992).

Biles, along with Douglas, Dowell, Kocian, Nichols, Raisman, and Skinner, was selected to represent the United States at the 2015 World Artistic Gymnastics Championships in Glasgow, Scotland. Biles once again qualified in first place in the all-around, vault, beam, and floor finals. Her uneven bars score would have qualified her in eighth place in that final as well, but she was excluded, as per the rules, after teammates Kocian and Douglas qualified ahead of her. In team finals, she helped the United States team win their third consecutive gold medal at a World Championships event. During the all-around final, Biles performed below her usual standard, taking a large hop on the vault, landing out of bounds on floor (which she stated was a first), and grasping the beam to prevent a fall. However, her final score of 60.399 was more than enough to secure the title with her largest margin of victory yet (over a point ahead of silver medalist Gabby Douglas and bronze medalist Larisa Iordache). With that victory, Biles became the first woman to win three consecutive all-around titles in World Gymnastics Championships history. During day one of event finals, Biles competed on vault, taking bronze behind Maria Paseka (RUS) and Hong Un Jong (PRK). On day two, she competed on balance beam and floor exercise, retaining her world title on both events by large margins. This brought Biles's total World Championships medal count to 14, the most for any American, and total gold medal count to ten, the most for any woman in World Championships history.

2016 
In April, Biles began her season at the Pacific Rim Championships, where she won the all-around title and had the highest score on vault (where she debuted a more difficult second vault), floor exercise (where she debuted a new floor routine), and balance beam. Additionally, the U.S. won the team title by a wide margin. Biles did not compete in the event finals. On June 4, Biles competed at the Secret U.S. Classic on two events only, the uneven bars and beam. She placed first on balance beam with a 15.650 and placed fifth on uneven bars with a 15.1.In the following weeks at the 2016 U.S. National Championships, Biles won the all-around title by a wide margin of 3.9 points over Aly Raisman. She won the gold medal on vault and floor exercise, receiving scores of at least 16 all four times. She also won the gold medal on balance beam and placed fourth on uneven bars.

On July 10, Biles was named to the team for the 2016 Rio Summer Olympics, alongside Gabby Douglas, Laurie Hernandez, Madison Kocian, and Aly Raisman.

In September 2016, Biles' medical information was released and she was accused of doping to enhance performance following the Russian cyber espionage group Fancy Bear's hack into the World Anti Doping Agency. Biles then disclosed on Twitter that she has attention deficit hyperactivity disorder and was permitted to take medication for it, having applied for and received a therapeutic use exemption.

2016 Summer Olympics

Biles appeared with gymnasts Dominique Dawes and Nadia Comăneci in a commercial for Tide called "The Evolution of Power" prior to the 2016 Summer Olympics.

On August 7, Biles competed in the Women's Qualification at the 2016 Summer Olympics. Along with helping the US team qualify in first place to the team final with a score of 185.238 (9.959 points ahead of the second-place team, China) she individually qualified as the top gymnast into four of the five individual finals: the all-around with a score of 62.416, vault with an average score of 16.050, balance beam with a score of 15.633, and floor exercise with a score of 15.733.

On August 9, Biles won her first Olympic gold medal in the gymnastics team event. The only gymnast for Team USA to compete on all four events in the final, she contributed an all-around score of 61.833 (15.933 on vault, 14.800 on bars, 15.300 on beam, and 15.800 on floor) as the Americans won the gold with a score of 184.897, over 8 points ahead of the silver medal Russian team.

Biles won the gold medal in the individual all-around on August 11, ahead of teammate Aly Raisman and Russia's Aliya Mustafina . Biles earned a total score of 62.198 with 15.866 on the vault, 14.966 on the uneven bars, 15.433 on the balance beam, and 15.933 on the floor. Biles had the highest scores on vault, balance beam, and floor; she had the only score over 15 on balance beam in the finals. She and Raisman became the second pair of American gymnasts to win gold and silver in the individual all-around, after Nastia Liukin and Shawn Johnson in 2008.

In the vault final, she scored 15.900 for her Amânar and 16.033 for her Cheng to win her second individual gold medal with an average score of 15.966, more than 0.7 points ahead of second-place finisher Maria Paseka of Russia and third-place finisher Giulia Steingruber of Switzerland.

In the balance beam final, she grabbed the beam with her hands (a mandatory 0.5 point deduction) after underrotating her front tuck and scored a 14.733. Despite her mistake, she won the bronze medal behind teammate Laurie Hernandez (who won silver with a score of 15.333), and Sanne Wevers of the Netherlands (who won the gold medal scoring 15.466).

In the floor exercise final, she won gold with a score of 15.966. Teammate Aly Raisman won silver with a score of 15.500 and Amy Tinkler of Great Britain won bronze scoring 14.933. With Biles' five total medals along with Madison Kocian's silver medal on the uneven bars, the USA claimed a medal in every women's artistic gymnastics event for the first time since 1984.

With four Olympic gold medals, Biles set an American record for most gold medals in women's gymnastics at a single Games, and equaled a number of other records with her medals won in Rio. Biles winning four gold medals was the first instance of a quadruple gold medallist in women's gymnastics at a single Games since Ecaterina Szabo (Romania) in 1984, and fifth overall, after Larisa Latynina (USSR, 1956), Agnes Keleti (HUN, 1956), Věra Čáslavská (CZE, 1968) and Szabo. Biles became the sixth female gymnast to have won an individual all-around title at both the World Championships and the Olympics—the others being Larisa Latynina, Věra Čáslavská, Ludmilla Tourischeva, Elena Shushunova, and Lilia Podkopayeva. Biles is the first female gymnast since Lilia Podkopayeva (UKR) in 1996 to win gold in the all-around as well as an event final, and the first female gymnast since Podkopayeva to win the Olympic all-around title while holding the World and European/American individual all-around titles. Biles joins Latynina (1956–1960), Čáslavská (1964–1968) and Tourischeva (1968–1972), as the fourth female gymnast to win every major all-around title in an Olympic cycle.

Biles joined Mary Lou Retton in 1984, Shannon Miller in 1992, and Nastia Liukin in 2008 in winning five women's gymnastics medals at a single Olympiad, along with Szabo (ROU, 1984), Nadia Comaneci (ROU, 1976),  and Karin Janz (East Germany, 1972). Olga Mostepanova (USSR) also won five gold medals at the Alternate Olympics in 1984. The overall record for most women's Olympic gymnastics medals at a single games (majority gold), remains six medals (Latynina, 1956, 1960, and 1964, Keleti, 1956,  Caslavska, 1968, Daniela Silivas, 1988).

Biles and her teammate, Gabby Douglas, are the only American female gymnasts to win both the individual all-around gold and team gold at the same Olympiad. Douglas won both in the 2012 London Games.

Biles was chosen by Team USA to be the flag bearer in the closing ceremonies, becoming the first American female gymnast to receive this honor.

Hiatus

Biles did not compete in 2017.

After the 2016 Rio Games, she co-wrote an autobiography with journalist Michelle Burford, Courage to Soar: A Body in Motion, A Life in Balance. Biles said, "I want people to reach for their dreams and there are so many people who have inspired me with their love and encouragement along the way-and I want to pass on that inspiration to readers." The book hit number one on The New York Times best sellers Young Adult list the week of January 8, 2017, and was turned into a Lifetime biopic.

Biles competed on season 24 of Dancing with the Stars, attempting to replicate her Rio teammate Laurie Hernandez's win in season 23. Paired with professional dancer Sasha Farber, she was favored to win, but was eliminated on May 15, 2017, one week before the finals, finishing in fourth place.

In August, during the 2017 P&G National Championships, Biles said that she had returned to the gym to start conditioning. Her longtime coach, Aimee Boorman, had moved to Florida with her family; in October Biles hired coach Laurent Landi, who had coached her Olympic teammate Madison Kocian.

Return to competition

2018
Biles was added back to the National Team on March 1 after the Athlete Selection Committee viewed recent videos of her performances. Her first competition of the year was the U.S. Classic in July, where she won the all-around title ahead of Riley McCusker by 1.200 points. She also won the gold medal on floor and balance beam and recorded the highest single vault score. Her all-around score of 58.700 became the highest score recorded under the 2017–2020 Code of Points despite a fall on the uneven bars and an out-of-bounds penalty on floor exercise. She showed numerous upgrades to her routines from 2016, including a Fabrichnova (double-twisting double back dismount) and a Van Leeuwen on uneven bars, and a Moors (double-twisting double layout) on floor exercise.

In August, Biles competed at the 2018 National Championships. She placed first in every event over the two days of competition, the first woman to do so since Dominique Dawes in 1994. Biles won the all-around title 6.55 points ahead of second-place finisher and reigning world champion Morgan Hurd and set a record for the most national all-around titles with five. This placement also marked her fourth national vault title, third national balance beam and floor exercise titles, and first national uneven bars title. Her 60.100 all-around score from the first day of competition was the first score recorded above 60 since her own all-around victory at the 2016 Olympics. She was named to her seventh national team and was invited to the October selection camp for the 2018 World Championships.

At the 2018 Youth Olympics, the mixed multi-discipline teams were named for gymnastics legends, including Biles, Nadia Comăneci, and Kōhei Uchimura. The team named for Biles won gold.

In October, Biles participated in the World Team Selection Camp. She placed first in the all-around as well as first on vault and floor exercise. She placed second on the uneven bars behind McCusker, and fourth on balance beam (due to hands touching the mat on dismount) behind Kara Eaker, McCusker, and Ragan Smith. Biles debuted a new vault: a Yurchenko with a half turn onto the table with a stretched salto forward off with two full twists (Cheng with an extra half twist). The following day she was named to the team to compete at the 2018 World Championships alongside McCusker, Hurd, Grace McCallum, Eaker, and alternate Ragan Smith.

2018 World Championships 
In late October, at the 2018 World Championships in Doha, Qatar, Biles went to an emergency room the night before the qualification round because of stomach pains that turned out to be a kidney stone.  After confirming that it was not appendicitis, she checked herself out of the hospital. The following day, she qualified to the all-around, vault, balance beam, and floor exercise finals in first place, and to the uneven bars final in second place behind Nina Derwael of Belgium. After successfully performing the vault she premiered at the selection camp, it was named the Biles in the Code of Points and given a difficulty value of 6.4 (for the 2017–2020 code of points), which was tied with the Produnova for the most difficult women's vault ever competed. The US also qualified to the team final in first place. During the team final, Biles competed on all four events, recording the highest score of any competitor on vault, uneven bars, and floor exercise. The U.S. team won the gold medal with a score of 171.629, 8.766 points ahead of second place Russia, beating previous margin of victory records set in the open-ended code of points era at the 2014 World Championships (6.693) and the 2016 Summer Olympics (8.209).

In the all-around final, Biles won the gold medal by a margin of 1.7 points despite falling on both the vault and the balance beam. The overwhelming difficulty gap between her and her competitors allowed her to claim the title with a score of 57.491 over silver medalist Mai Murakami of Japan and bronze medalist Morgan Hurd. Earning her fourth world all-around title, Biles set a new record for most women's World All-Around titles, surpassing the previous record of three held by Svetlana Khorkina. She also became the first defending Olympic women's all-around champion to earn a world all-around title since 1972 Olympic champion Lyudmilla Turischeva did so in 1974.

In the event finals, Biles won the gold medal on vault, her first ever world vault title. The two vaults she competed were a Cheng and an Amanar. This marked her thirteenth World gold medal, meaning Biles had won the most Gymnastics World Championships titles of any gender, breaking Soviet Vitaly Scherbo's previous record of twelve gold medals. She then won the silver medal on uneven bars behind Nina Derwael of Belgium. By winning a medal on uneven bars, Biles became the first American and the tenth female gymnast from any country to have won a World Championship medal on every event. The following day, she won the bronze medal on balance beam behind Liu Tingting of China and Ana Padurariu of Canada after a large balance check on her Barani. She then won the gold medal on floor exercise with a strong routine. In doing so, she became the first U.S. gymnast and first non-Soviet gymnast to win a medal on every event at a single World Championships, as well as the first gymnast from any country to do so since Elena Shushunova in 1987. Her 6 medals at this World Championships brought her total number of world medals to 20, which tied her with Khorkina for most world medals won.

2019

In early March, Biles competed at the Stuttgart World Cup, her first World Cup appearance not on American soil.  She finished in first place, 3.668 points ahead of second-place Ana Padurariu of Canada.

In July, Biles competed at the 2019 GK US Classic.  During podium training, she performed a triple-twisting double-tucked salto backwards (upgraded from a Silivas), but did not perform it during the competition. Biles won the all-around, 2.1 points ahead of second-place finisher Riley McCusker. Individually, she placed fifth on bars behind Morgan Hurd, Sunisa Lee, Grace McCallum and McCusker, third on beam behind Kara Eaker and McCusker, and first on floor exercise.  She also had the highest single vault score, ahead of Jade Carey and MyKayla Skinner.

In August, Biles competed at the 2019 U.S. National Gymnastics Championships. She placed first in the all-around, with a two-day combined score of 118.500. In the competition, she became the first woman to complete a triple twisting double somersault on floor exercise and the first gymnast to complete a double twisting double somersault dismount off of the balance beam.  She placed first on vault, ahead of Jade Carey and MyKayla Skinner, first on balance beam ahead of Kara Eaker and Leanne Wong, first on floor exercise ahead of Carey and Sunisa Lee, and third on uneven bars behind Lee and Morgan Hurd.

In September, Biles competed at the US World Championships trials where she placed first in the all-around, despite falling on her dismount off the uneven bars, and earned a place on the team that would compete at the 2019 World Championships in Stuttgart. The following day her teammates Sunisa Lee, Kara Eaker, MyKayla Skinner, Jade Carey, and Grace McCallum were also named to the team.

2019 World Championships 

During qualifications at the World Championships, Biles helped the USA qualify to the team final in first place, over five points ahead of second-place China. Individually, she qualified to the all-around, balance beam, and floor exercise finals in first place, the vault final in second place by a margin of one one-thousandth below teammate Jade Carey, and the uneven bars final in seventh place. She debuted two new eponymous skills: the Biles II on floor exercise, a triple-twisting double-tucked somersault, and the Biles on balance beam, a double-twisting double-tucked somersault dismount. Both elements were given the highest difficulty rating of J (1.0) for all elements on their respective apparatus, and the Biles II is the only element in artistic gymnastics to receive the J rating across all disciplines for both men and women.

In the team final, Biles led Team USA to its fifth consecutive team title, contributing scores of 15.400, 14.600, 14.433, and 15.333 on vault, uneven bars, balance beam, and floor exercise, respectively. In doing so, Biles surpassed Russian gymnast Svetlana Khorkina as the most-decorated female gymnast in World Championship history. Her scores on vault, balance beam, and floor exercise were the highest of the day.  During the all-around final Biles won gold with a score of 58.999, a record-setting 2.1 points ahead of second-place finisher Tang Xijing of China. Once again, she recorded the highest scores of the day on vault, balance beam, and floor exercise.

During the first day of event finals, Biles won the gold medal on vault, ahead of teammate Carey and Ellie Downie of Great Britain.  After earning a medal on vault, her 23rd World Championships medal, Biles tied the record for most medals won at the World Championships with Soviet/Belarusian gymnast Vitaly Scherbo.  During the uneven bars final Biles earned a score of 14.700, finishing in fifth place, one tenth behind bronze medalist and teammate Sunisa Lee.

On the second day of event finals Biles scored 15.066 on the balance beam, earning the gold medal over reigning World balance beam Champion Liu Tingting and Li Shijia, both of China, by over 0.6 points. This marked Biles's 24th World Championships medal, surpassing Scherbo's record and making Biles the sole record holder for most World Championship medals won by a gymnast, whether male or female. Before the final, Biles credited her improved confidence on beam in the past year to her coach Cecile Canqueteau-Landi, who helped rework her routine following shaky performances in the event finals at the 2016 Summer Olympics and the 2018 World Championships. Biles and Landi removed inconsistent skills including the Barani, front pike, and front tuck saltos, replacing them with skills such as an aerial cartwheel (which Biles had not performed since 2014) and introducing the upgraded Biles dismount.

On floor exercise Biles won gold with a score of 15.133, one point more than silver medalist Lee.  By winning five gold medals in Stuttgart, Biles tied the record of most gold medals won at a single World Championships with Larisa Latynina and Boris Shakhlin, who both accomplished this at the 1958 World Championships. Furthermore, by winning her fifth gold medal on floor exercise, Biles tied the record for most world titles on one apparatus with Italian Jury Chechi (who won five gold medals on still rings) and Russian Svetlana Khorkina (who won five gold medals on uneven bars).

2020
In February it was announced that Biles was chosen to represent the United States at the Tokyo World Cup taking place on April 4. However, in March USA Gymnastics announced that Biles would not attend due to concern about the ongoing COVID-19 pandemic both domestically and worldwide (including Japan).  The following day the Japanese Gymnastics Association announced that they had canceled the event.

2021
In May, Biles competed at the U.S. Classic.  She debuted a Yurchenko double pike vault, which no woman had ever completed before, on her way to another U.S. Classic all-around title. The new vault was given a preliminary value of 6.6, making it the highest valued vault in women's gymnastics.

In June, Biles competed at the U.S. National Championships and won her 7th national all-around title and qualified for the Olympic Trials. In addition to winning the all-around title by 4.7 points, Biles also placed first in the vault, balance beam, and floor exercise, as well as third in the uneven bars. At the Olympic Trials, Biles placed first and earned an automatic spot onto the Olympic team. She finished 2.266 points ahead of second-place finisher Sunisa Lee; however Lee's day two score of the competition (58.166) was higher than Biles's (57.533), which was the first time anyone has posted a higher single-day all-around score than Biles since Kyla Ross in 2013.  Also named to the Olympic team were Lee, Biles's club teammate Jordan Chiles, and Grace McCallum.

2020 Summer Olympics 
At the 2020 Olympic Games, Biles performed the all-around during the qualifications and helped the United States qualify for the team final, in second place behind the ROC team. She suffered several mishaps during qualifications: she bounced entirely off the floor landing on one of her tumbling passes and stepped one foot off the landing mat during her Cheng vault, and took several large stumbles back on her balance beam dismount. Despite these mistakes, Biles still qualified for the all-around final in first place. She also qualified in first place for the vault final, advanced to the floor exercise final in second place behind Vanessa Ferrari, and qualified for the balance beam and uneven bars finals. She was the only athlete to qualify for all the individual finals.

Following her qualifications performance, Biles stated on Instagram that she was "[feeling] the weight of the world on [her] shoulders" and that she felt affected by the pressure of the Olympics.

During warm-ups for the first rotation of the team final, Biles balked on her Amanar vault mid-air, performing 1.5 twists instead of the expected 2.5. She repeated this in the competition, balking and performing the 1.5 twist with a large lunge and near-fall on the landing, and scored just 13.766 with a difficulty score of 5.0 (rather than the Amanar's 5.8). She subsequently left the competition floor (although she returned to the floor a few minutes later) and withdrew from the rest of the team competition, citing mental health issues. Biles later explained that she was inspired by fellow female Olympian Naomi Osaka, who had withdrawn from the French Open and Wimbledon Championships earlier in the year for similar reasons. The U.S. team went on to win the silver medal behind the ROC athletes.
On July 28, 2021, Biles withdrew from the finals of the individual all-around competition, again citing mental health concerns. Following further medical evaluation on July 30, she also withdrew from the vault and uneven bars finals, both scheduled for the first day of the individual event finals. Due to a continued mental block, on July 31, Biles also withdrew from the floor final, scheduled for the second day of individual event finals, while still leaving the possibility of competing in the balance beam final on the last day of the event finals. She later confirmed on August 2 that she would compete in the beam final. Although Biles performed a relatively scaled down routine with an easier double pike dismount in the beam final, she won the bronze medal behind China's Guan Chenchen and Tang Xijing. With the bronze, she tied Shannon Miller for most Olympic medals by an American female gymnast with seven total. Biles also tied Larisa Latynina of the Soviet Union for most medals won by a female gymnast of all time with 32 combined World and Olympic medals. She called her bronze beam medal her most meaningful one, as she felt it symbolized her focus on mental health and her perseverance. Biles later revealed that her aunt had passed unexpectedly two days before the beam event final.

Biles explained that she withdrew primarily due to experiencing "the twisties", a psychological phenomenon causing a gymnast to lose air awareness while performing twisting elements, throughout the Olympics. She noted that while it was not the first time she had had the twisties on vault or floor, it was the first time she experienced them on uneven bars and balance beam. Biles made the decision to withdraw after the first rotation of the team final because she felt that she had "simply got so lost [her] safety was at risk as well as a team medal." During the week, Juntendo University allowed Biles to practice at their gym, located an hour outside of Tokyo, where she could practice quietly away from the public eye.

Some commentators criticized Biles, accusing her of being a "quitter" or selfishly depriving another athlete of the chance to compete. She was also slandered with racist, sexist, and transphobic comments in the Russian state-owned media, as well as openly accused of being a drug cheat due to her Therapeutic Use Exemption for ADHD medication. Multiple gymnasts, however, defended Biles' decision and relayed their own stories of struggling with the twisties. Biles' decision to prioritize her mental health was generally widely praised and credited with starting a wider conversation about the role of mental health in sports. Alongside Biles, other Olympians in Tokyo also showed greater willingness to discuss and publicly acknowledge mental health issues, indicative of a wider approach to sport where athletes are prioritizing their health over performance.

Awards 

Biles was named Team USA Female Olympic Athlete of the Year in December 2015, making her the fourth gymnast to win the honor. In December 2016, Biles was chosen as one of the sponsors of the US Navy aircraft carrier USS Enterprise alongside swimmer Katie Ledecky. They are the first Olympians to be given this honor. In 2016, Simone Biles won the Glamour Award for the Record Breaker. In 2016, she was chosen as one of BBC's 100 Women, and after the world championships, she was named one of ESPNW's Impact 25 and chosen as Sportswoman of the Year by the Women's Sports Foundation. She was also one of the finalists for Times 2016 Person of the Year. Biles was also nominated for a 2016 ESPY award for Best Female Athlete along with Elena Delle Donne, Katie Ledecky, and Breanna Stewart; Stewart won the award. In 2016, Biles became the third gymnast after Olga Korbut and Nadia Comăneci to be named the BBC Overseas Sports Personality of the Year.

In July 2017, Biles won the ESPY Award for Best Female Athlete. She is the second gymnast to win this award after Nastia Liukin won it in 2009. In 2017, Simone won the Shorty Awards for the best in sports. At the 2017 Teen Choice Awards, Simone won favorite female athlete, and won Laureus World Sports Award for Sportswoman of the Year in 2017. In 2017, Biles was awarded the Golden Plate Award of the American Academy of Achievement. In 2018, Biles was inducted into the Texas Women's Hall of Fame. In May 2018, it was announced that Biles and the other survivors would be awarded the Arthur Ashe Courage Award. In December, it was announced that Biles was named ESPN The Magazine's most dominant athlete of 2018.  In February 2019, it was announced that Biles was named Laureus' Sportswoman of the Year for the second time, beating out tennis players Simona Halep and Angelique Kerber, snowboarder Ester Ledecká, triathlete Daniela Ryf, and skier Mikaela Shiffrin.  Biles was nominated for the 2019 ESPY Award for Best Female Athlete but lost to soccer player Alex Morgan.  In November 2019, Biles won the People's Choice Award for The Game Changer of 2019.  In February 2020 Biles was awarded the Laureus World Sports Award for Sportswoman of the Year for the second consecutive year and third time overall, beating out nominees Allyson Felix, Megan Rapinoe, Mikaela Shiffrin, Naomi Osaka, and Shelly-Ann Fraser.

In February 2021, Biles criticized ESPN's SportsCenter for excluding women athletes in their "Greatest of All Time" picture. In September 2021, she appeared on the Time 100, an annual list of the 100 most influential people in the world, for "championing mental health".

On July 7, 2022, Biles was presented with the Presidential Medal of Freedom, the nation's highest honor given to civilians, by President Joe Biden in a ceremony at the White House; she was among a group of 17 honorees that included Megan Rapinoe. She is the youngest person to receive this award.

 Sponsors and endorsements 
Biles signed with the Octagon sports agency in July 2015, which also markets fellow American gymnast Aly Raisman and Olympic swimmer Michael Phelps. In November 2015, she announced on Twitter her sponsorship by Nike. On November 23, 2015, she signed a deal to allow GK Elite Sportswear to sell a line of leotards bearing her name. Later in 2015, Biles signed a deal with Core Power to become a spokesperson on its Everyday Awesome team of athletes. In August 2016, Kellogg's put the Final Five's picture on the Gold Medal Edition of Special berries; the back of the box showed Biles with one of her Rio gold medals. After the 2016 Rio games, Biles signed deals to endorse Procter & Gamble, The Hershey Company, and United Airlines. In September 2016, Biles became a spokesperson for Mattress Firm's program of supporting foster homes. In 2016, Biles signed a deal with Spieth America to create a line of gymnastics equipment, and another to become a spokesperson for Beats By Dr Dre. In 2018, she worked with Caboodles to create and market products for women with active lifestyles. In April 2021, Biles announced that she was leaving Nike for a new apparel sponsorship with the Gap's Athleta brand.

 Personal life 
Biles was in a relationship with fellow gymnast Stacey Ervin Jr from August 2017 to March 2020.  She has been in a relationship with professional American football player Jonathan Owens since August 2020.  Biles announced her engagement to Owens on February 15, 2022.

Career-related injuries and health
In October 2013, Biles had surgery for bone spurs in her right tibia bone resulting in a three-week sidelining.

In 2014, Biles had a shoulder injury resulting in withdrawal from the March 2014 American Cup.

In September 2017, Biles opened up about having attention deficit hyperactivity disorder (ADHD) after her medical records were leaked online, revealing that she had been taking Ritalin (methylphenidate), used to treat the condition, during the Olympics. Having been diagnosed as a child, she had previously disclosed her condition to the World Anti-Doping Agency and obtained a medical exemption, allowing her to take the medication during competitions. In Biles's statement, she said that ADHD is "nothing to be ashamed of and nothing that I'm afraid to let people know."

In 2018, Biles suffered a broken toe. She also suffered from a kidney stone.

Larry Nassar assault

On January 18, 2018, Biles released a statement on Twitter confirming that former USA Gymnastics physician Larry Nassar had sexually assaulted her. She also alleged that USA Gymnastics had a role in allowing the abuse to occur and subsequently covering it up. She did not attend court hearings held from January 16 to 24, 2018, citing that she "wasn't emotionally ready to face Larry Nassar again". In May 2018, it was announced that Biles and the other survivors would be awarded the Arthur Ashe Courage Award. At the 2018 U.S. National Championships, Biles designed and wore a teal leotard that she stated was meant to honor the survivors of Nassar's abuse, as a statement of unification. On September 15, 2021, Biles testified to the Senate Judiciary Committee that she blamed "the entire system" for enabling and perpetuating Nassar's crimes, saying that USA Gymnastics and the United States Olympic and Paralympic Committee "failed to do their jobs". Three of her national team teammates, McKayla Maroney, Maggie Nichols, and Aly Raisman, testified with her.

 Skills 

 Selected competitive skills 
Biles is well known for performing difficult skills at a high level of execution. Her 2018 routine on vault and her 2019 routine on floor exercise are the most difficult ever performed in women's artistic gymnastics. As of 2019, she is the sole gymnast to have competed four skills valued at H or higher in the 2017–2021 Code of Points on floor exercise.

Among the skills she has performed in her senior career (E-rated and higher):

 Eponymous skills 

Biles's named elements on vault, balance beam, and floor exercise introduced during the 2017–2021 quad are the most difficult elements on each apparatus (the Biles on beam, Biles on vault, and Biles II''''' on floor). As of 2023, she is the sole gymnast to have performed any of these skills in an FIG international competition. In May 2021, she became the first woman to complete a Yurchenko double piked on the vault during competition.

Competitive history

See also
List of top female medalists at the World Artistic Gymnastics Championships
Final Five – the gold medal-winning team at the 2016 Summer Olympics
MeToo movement
List of Olympic female artistic gymnasts for the United States
History of Central Americans in Houston

References

External links

 
 
 
 
 Biles (floor exercise) at g-flash.net
 

1997 births
Living people
African-American Catholics
African-American female gymnasts
African American adoptees
American adoptees
American female artistic gymnasts
BBC Sports Personality World Sport Star of the Year winners
Catholics from Ohio
Catholics from Texas
Gymnasts at the 2016 Summer Olympics
Gymnasts from Ohio
Gymnasts from Texas
Medalists at the 2016 Summer Olympics
Medalists at the World Artistic Gymnastics Championships
Olympic bronze medalists for the United States in gymnastics
Olympic silver medalists for the United States in gymnastics
Olympic gold medalists for the United States in gymnastics
Originators of elements in artistic gymnastics
Presidential Medal of Freedom recipients
People from Spring, Texas
Sportspeople from Columbus, Ohio
Sportspeople from Harris County, Texas
U.S. women's national team gymnasts
World champion gymnasts
BBC 100 Women
Naturalized citizens of Belize
Shorty Award winners
Gymnasts at the 2020 Summer Olympics
Medalists at the 2020 Summer Olympics
21st-century African-American sportspeople
21st-century African-American women
People with attention deficit hyperactivity disorder